Pawan Kumar Chamling was elected as Chief Minister of Sikkim for fifth time in May 2014. Here is the list of ministers-:

Chief Minister & Council of Ministers

References

Sikkim Democratic Front
2014 in Indian politics
Sikkim ministries
2014 establishments in Sikkim
2019 disestablishments in India
Cabinets established in 2014
Cabinets disestablished in 2019